Once upon the Cross is the third studio album by American death metal band Deicide. It was released on April 18, 1995, by Roadrunner Records.

The samples at the beginning of the opening track "Once upon the Cross" and "Trick or Betrayed" are taken from the film The Last Temptation of Christ.

Background
Steve Asheim said of Once upon the Cross, "Listening back, ...Cross seems very slow. Live we play those songs much faster. Actually we've always played them faster than they are on the record. When we went in the studio in '94 and I recorded the drum tracks at the speed I had been playing them at practice, we only had 22 minutes with the same amount of songs, they were just faster. 22 minutes does not make an album so I re-recorded the songs at a more controlled pace and still only ended up with 30 minutes. So there it was."

Critical reception

David Jehnzen of Allmusic said, "A typically brutal set from Deicide that is particularly notable for the guitar pyrotechnics of Eric and Brian Hoffman." He also noted, "the band continues to grow."

Track listing

Personnel
Glen Benton – bass, vocals
Eric Hoffman – guitars
Brian Hoffman – guitars
Steve Asheim – drums
Deicide – production
Scott Burns – production

References

1995 albums
Deicide (band) albums
Roadrunner Records albums
Albums produced by Scott Burns (record producer)
Albums recorded at Morrisound Recording